Emmeline Stuart (1866–1946) was the first female doctor with an official medical degree to join the Church Missionary Society's Persia Mission. Working primarily in Julaf, Isfahan, and Shiraz, she is known primarily for spearheading the development and day-to-day operations of a prominent women's hospital and regional dispensary.

Early life and education 
Emmeline Stuart was born and raised in Edinburgh, Scotland before getting her M.B. (Bachelor of Medicine) from a school in Glasgow.

Stuart is the older sister of Charlotte Harriet Pidsley, an assistant teacher from the Home and Colonial Training Institution Practising School who became a CMS Missionary on July 5, 1898; Pidsely first left to serve for the Sierra Leone Mission in Freetown at the Annie Walsh School on October 15, 1898, traveling back and forth between Freetown and England until August 1904. Stuart is also the cousin of Anne Isabella Stuart, who began serving in Persia independently in 1894, became a formal CMS Missionary in 1902, and officially joined the Persia Mission in Isfahan in 1903 alongside Dr. Stuart.

Stuart is the niece of Edward Craig Stuart of Edinburgh, a decorated Bishop, founder of St. John's College, and member of the Church of England Zenana Missionary Society; who travelled to Agra, Calcutta, New Zealand, and (with Stuart) Persia through his missionary work.

On November 19, 1895, Emmeline Stuart joined the Church Missionary Society, leaving for her first mission to Julfa, Persia at age 30 on March 25, 1897. She would eventually return to London on September 24, 1902, only to go back to Julfa on September 18, 1903.

Missionary work

Early patient visits 
Transitioning from the CMS's temporary Punjab and Sindh Mission at the beginning of her missionary work, Dr. Stuart spent a considerable amount of time visiting patients in the outskirts of Julfa, though she was generally unable to visit more than one patient a day. (Traveling to a single patient' home took about two hours and the hot weather restricted their travel to late afternoon.) Initially finding little time to study the new language, Dr. Stuart visited villages with her cousin Anne, who read, spoke, and sang Persian hymns far better. During some visits, villagers swarmed her, and she often had to escape amidst large crowds; during others, she was met with fear and resistance from villages where Babis were cruelly murdered by outsiders a few years prior.

Dr. Emmeline Stuart was among the first to reach Isfahan–the home of much of her missionary career–alongside Ms. Braine-Hartnell and Ms. Biggs. At the time, Isfahan (rendered in English as Ispahan) was a city of about 75,000 inhabitants in what is now central Iran, three hundred miles south of the capital Tehran; one of the great centres of Islamic learning, Isfahan was over 200 miles away from the nearest CMS station in Yezd. Legally, no open Christian preaching was allowed amid Dr. Stuart's arrival; nevertheless, there were more than a hundred baptized women in Ispahan, and schools had been established for both Persian and Parsi ladies.

Women's hospital 
Stuart took over Mary Bird's work, who for decades, without formal training, focused on meeting the needs of the poorest communities by spearheading a regional, multi-disciplinary women's hospital in Julfa. Built from sun-dried mud bricks, the one-story men's and women's hospitals sat side-by-side, separated by both a wall and doctors' and nurses' houses. The hospitals served Muslims, Armenians, Jews, Parsis, Bakhtiaris, and Kaskais, charging very small out-patient fees and larger in-patient fees when possible given their financial means.

Supported at the women's hospital by seven to eight Persian and Armenian nurses, Dr. Stuart's professional work centered around general medicine, surgery, and specialty eye and tubercular care. While most patients still largely visited native doctors for care, the women's hospital's purely medical practice still grew noticeably with Stuart. In particular, Stuart's extensive operative work (particularly ovariotomies) attracted both patients from far and wide as well as native doctors, who would observe operating days and learn to perform some major operations. Though patients generally faced few tropical diseases, treatment for malaria, dysentery, tropical liver abscess, and oriental sore was provided as needed. In 1904, Persia faced a terrible outbreak of cholera that placed extensive pressure on the CMS' hospital systems. 

Dr. Emmeline Stuart faced severe understaffing and grave under-resourcing--often missing sheets, bandages, towels, sponges, and clothing--during her hospital leadership. The local town authorities' construction of new roads also left masses of broken bricks, stones, and debris for the hospital's staff and patients to circumvent.

Gynecology and midwifery
The women's hospital's gynecological department and midwifery practice grew substantially under Dr. Stuart's leadership.  As for the weekly logistics, Dr. Stuart oversaw visits to the wards and patients' homes daily, visits to out-patients three times a week, operations twice a week, and gynecological clinics once a week.

Moving the hospital
In April of 1906, Dr. Stuart played a pivotal role in transferring the women's hospital from the suburban Julfa to the urban Ispahan. She organized a week-long operation transporting equipment and materials via donkey, as well as hosted three separate housewarmings (European, Armenian, and Persian) to welcome diverse communities onto hospital premises.

Evangelism 
As she detailed in one of the CMS' routine Mercy & Truth publications, Dr. Stuart considered her work evangelism, an expression and extension of Christ's "spiritual love." She formally directed systematic Christian ward teachings every afternoon, out-patient addresses twice a week, and special hospital services once a week, alongside her informal one-on-one conversations with hundreds met through her hospital work. 

To quantify the results of her hospital teachings, Stuart reported monthly baptisms (totaling a few dozen in all) to the CMS. In one noted instance, she even helped organize the community's first Persian Christian wedding for hospital assistant Ruth, the daughter of Stuart's longtime servant. In another, Stuart and the hospital staff sang hymns to an untreatable burn victim: a 14-year-old girl set afire by her husband.

Legacy 
Dr. Stuart pioneered the development of distinguished women's in-patient quarters–which had previously been housed in the same building as the men's–within her first year of heading the CMS's Persian Medical Mission. In 1903, she helped negotiate the Persian donation of seven acres of land at Isfahan's city borders for building both men's and women's hospitals and doctors' and nurses' houses. She reserved 15 single wards for private patients who could not only cover their own costs but also help move the hospital towards a more self-supporting standing; to attract these classes of patients, Stuart helped secure medical treatment contracts with local banks and some European business firms.

In April 1905, the women's hospital officially opened under Dr. Stuart's supervision with over seventy beds to accommodate patients. Though the men's and women's hospitals were financially part of one medical mission, she ensured that both had their own complete sets of equipment, well-fitted operation rooms, out-patient departments, dispensaries, and rooms for the treatment of special diseases.

In 1923, Dr. Stuart opened and operated a dispensary in Shiraz with Dr. Donald Carr, a fellow missionary physician; by the time the construction started in earnest in 1929, however, Dr. Carr had returned home and left the brunt of the responsibility on Dr. Stuart's shoulders. Her decades of consistent leadership paved the way for the CMS to send additional medical missionaries, like Dr. Winifred Westlake in 1902 and Dr. Catherine Ironside in 1904-1905, to sustainably continue her work. Her successful women's hospital model also allowed for regional scaling in Yezd by Dr. Urania Latham.

Dr. Stuart's esteem in the CMS made her one of the few regular speakers at the organization's Annual M.M.A. Meeting.

References 

Medical missionaries